This is a list of football (soccer) clubs in Burundi.
For a complete list see :Category:Football clubs in Burundi

List

A
AS Inter Star
Atlético Olympic F.C.

F
Flambeau de l’Est
Flamengo de Ngagara

L
Lydia Ludic Burundi Académic FC

P
Prince Louis F.C.

V
Vital'O FC

Burundi
Football clubs
 
Football clubs